Climate change in Bangladesh is a critical issue as the country is one of the most vulnerable to the effects of climate change. In the 2020 edition of Germanwatch's Climate Risk Index, it ranked seventh in the list of countries most affected by climate calamities during the period 1999–2018. Bangladesh's vulnerability to climate change impacts is due to a combination of geographical factors, such as its flat, low-lying, and delta-exposed topography, and socio-economic factors, including its high population density, levels of poverty, and dependence on agriculture.

Factors such as frequent natural disasters, lack of infrastructure, high population density (166 million people living in an area of 147,570 km2 ), an extractivist economy and social disparities are increasing the vulnerability of the country in facing the current changing climatic conditions. Almost every year large regions of Bangladesh suffer from more intense events like cyclones, floods and erosion. The mentioned adverse events are slowing the development of the country by bringing socio-economical and environmental systems to almost collapse.

Natural hazards that come from increased rainfall, rising sea levels, and tropical cyclones are expected to increase as the climate changes, each seriously affecting agriculture, water and food security, human health, and shelter. Sea levels in Bangladesh are predicted to rise by up to 0.30 metres by 2050, resulting in the displacement of 0.9 million people, and by up to 0.74 metres by 2100, resulting in the displacement of 2.1 million people.

To address the sea level rise threat in Bangladesh, the Bangladesh Delta Plan 2100 was launched in 2018. The government of Bangladesh is working on a range of specific climate change adaptation strategies. Climate Change adaptation plays a crucial role in fostering the country's development. This is already being considered as a synergic urgent action together with other pressing factors which impede higher growth rates (such as the permanent threat of shocks – natural, economic or political – the uncertain impact of globalization, and an imbalanced world trade). As of 2020, it was seen falling short of most of its initial targets, still leaving 80 million people at risk of flooding where it should have been reduced to 60 million people. The progress is being monitored.

Impacts on the natural environment
Bangladesh is known for its vulnerability  to climate change and more specifically to natural disasters. It is important to mention the fact that the location of the country is vulnerable for the presence for three powerful rivers, Asian rivers, Brahmaputra, Ganges and the Meghna along with their numerous tributaries that could result massive floods.

Temperature and weather changes

Extreme weather events and natural disasters 
From a prehistoric age, Bangladesh has faced numerous natural disasters in every decade but due to climate change, the intensity of disasters has increased. The country experiences small to medium scale floods, cyclones, flash floods, and landslides almost every year. Between 1980 and 2008, it experienced 219 natural disasters. Flood is the most common form of disaster in Bangladesh. The country was affected by six major floods in the 19th century and 18 floods in the 20th century. Among them, 1987, 1985 and 1998 were the most catastrophic. Major cyclones occurred in the 20th centuries were in the years 1960, 1961, 1963, 1970, 1985, 1986, 1988, 1991, 1995. The cyclone in 1991 killed an estimated 140,000 people and 10 million people lost their homes. In recent past, the country faced two major cyclones in 2007 and 2009.

The geographic location of Bangladesh makes it highly prone to natural disasters. Situated in between the intersection of Himalayan mountains in the North and the Bay of Bengal in the South, the country experiences 2 completely different environmental conditions leading long monsoons and catastrophic natural disasters. With the new phenomenons like climate change and sea level rising, the situation is getting even worst. The country is also very low and flat, having only 10% land above 1 meter high of the sea level. Bangladesh frequently experiences gigantic cyclones and floods, being criss-crossed by hundreds of rivers and one of the largest river systems in the whole world, (the estuarial region of Padma, Meghna and Brahmaputra rivers).

Sea level rise 

Low-lying coastal regions, such as Bangladesh, are vulnerable to sea level rise and the increased occurrence of intense, extreme weather conditions such as the cyclones of 2007–2009, as well as the melting of polar ice. To address the sea level rise threat in Bangladesh, the Bangladesh Delta Plan 2100 has been launched in 2018.

Floods have a destructive power over the whole state of the country and it is directly related to climate change impacts. As estimated by UNICEF  more than 19 million children in Bangladesh will be threatened by this situation.

Impacts on people 

Bangladesh is one of the most populated countries in the world and the high population density of the country makes it vulnerable to any kind of natural disasters. In recent past, the country has shown remarkable success of poverty reduction yet 24% people live under poverty line. Moreover, the country is experiencing a rapid and unplanned urbanisation without ensuring the adequate infrastructure and basic social services. The unsustainable process of urbanisation makes the city dweller vulnerable to climate change as well.

Bangladesh has a critical environmental state by its nature. The fact that it has inland huge rivers makes it subject to constant floods especially due to severe climate change. Around 163 million living in Bangladesh has almost no escape from these natural phenomena due to their closeness to the rivers passing through and around the country.

Bangladesh lies at the bottom of the Ganges, the Brahmaputra and the Meghna (GBM) river system. Bangladesh is watered by a total of 57 trans-boundary rivers flowing to it: 54 from neighboring India and three from Myanmar. The country, which has no control of water flows and volume, drains to the Bay of Bengal. Coupled with the high level of widespread poverty and increasing population density, limited adaptive capacity, and poorly funded, ineffective local governance have made the region one of the most adversely affected on the planet. There are an estimated one thousand people in each square kilometer, with the national population increasing by two million people each year. Almost half the population is in poverty (defined as purchasing power parity of US$1.25 per person a day). The population lacks the resources to respond to natural disasters as the government cannot help them.

Economic impacts 
Bangladesh is one of the countries that contributes the least to greenhouse emissions, yet has one of the highest vulnerability conditions to global warming, prone to a significant number of climate related disasters. There are serious consequences from the impacts of climate change on different sectors of the economy in the country, mainly but not exclusively concentrated in the agriculture sector.

Agriculture
In most countries like Bangladesh, yields from rain-fed agriculture was predicted to be reduced to 50% by 2020. For a country with increasing population and hunger, this will have an adverse effect on food security. Although the effects of climate change are highly variable, by 2030, South Asia could lose 10% of rice and maize yields, while neighboring states like Pakistan could experience a 50% reduction in crop yield.

As a result of all this, Bangladesh would need to prepare for long-term adaptation, which could be as drastic as changing sowing dates due to seasonal variations, introducing different varieties and species, to practicing novel water supply and irrigation systems. Bangladeshi farmers have been adapting to rising water levels by making creative floating gardens which mesh water hyacinth plants with bamboo and fertilizer to provide a sturdy floating platform for agriculture, according to climate researcher Alizé Carrère.

Being an agrarian society, people of Bangladesh are greatly dependent on various forms of agriculture. It is the main source of rural job in the country having over 87% people somewhat related to agri-based economy. In 2016, according to World Bank, agriculture contributed to 14.77% of country's GDP. A steady increase in agricultural production with the use of modern equipment and scientific methods, agriculture has been a key driver to eradicate rural poverty in Bangladesh. The risk of sea level rising and global warming is the biggest challenge not only to country's agricultural improvement but also the success on poverty reduction.

As agricultural production is heavily related with temperature and rainfall, the current change in weather conditions is creating negative impact on crop yielding and the total area of arable land has been decreased. According to a report published by the Ministry of Environment and Forests - GoB, 1 degree Celsius increase in maximum temperature at vegetative, reproductive and ripening stages there was a decrease in Aman rice production by 2.94, 53.06 and 17.28 tons respectively. Another major threat deriving from this factor is water salinity which directly affects rice production especially in the coastal part of Bangladesh. The same report state that, the country will lose 12-16% of its land if the sea level rises by 1 meter. These challenges lead to food scarcity and insecurity for the huge populace of the country. There are several adaptation measures which are practised to cope up with the abnormal behaviour of climate such as: resilient varieties of crops, diversification, change in cropping pattern, mixed cropping, improved irrigation facility, adopting soil conservation, agroforestry and so on.

A number of these measures have already been adapted by the government of Bangladesh and well practised throughout the country. The Bangladesh Rice Research Institute has introduced a varieties of saline tolerant rices like BR-11, BR-23, BRRI rice -28, BRRI rice -41, BRRI rice -47, BRRI rice -53 and BRRI rice -54. In the drought prone areas, BR-11, BR-23, BRRI rice -28, BRRI rice -41, BRRI rice -47, BRRI rice -53 and BRRI rice -54 are used which take short time to cultivate. To make the best and efficient utilization of water the Department of Agricultural Extension has introduced  ‘Alternate Wetting and Drying (AWD). The government also provide financial support to the affected farmers from different disasters and hazards

Food security

With a larger population facing losses in arable lands, climate change poses an acute risk to the already malnourished population of Bangladesh. Although the country has managed to increase its production of rice since the nation's birth—from 10 million metric tons (MT) to over 30 MT—around 15.2 percent of the population is undernourished. Now more than five million hectares of land are irrigated, almost fourfold that in 1990. Even though modern rice varieties have been introduced in three-fourths of the total rice irrigation area, the sudden shift in population increase is putting strains on the production. Climate change threatens the agricultural economy, which, although it counts for just 20 percent of GDP, contributes to over half the labor force. In 2007, after a series of floods and cyclone Sidr, food security was severely threatened. Given the country's infrastructure and disaster response mechanisms, crop yields worsened. The loss of rice production was estimated at around two million metric tons (MT), which could potentially feed 10 million people. This was the single most important catalyst of the 2008 price increases, which led to around 15 million people going without much food. This was further worsened by cyclone Aila. In March 2017, extreme pre-monsoon rains and flash floods damaged 220,000 hectares of rice crops. Rice imports increased to three million tonnes from less than 100,000 tonnes the year before. A December 2018 study published by the American Meteorological Society found that climate change doubled the likelihood of the extreme pre-monsoon rainfall.

Given the frequent climate change-based catastrophes, Bangladesh needs to enhance food security by drafting and implementing new policies such as the 2006 National Sausage Policy. The Food and Agriculture Organization (FAO) supported this policy through the "National Food Policy Capacity Strengthening Program" (NFPCSP). There is also an initiative for the start of a "Food Security Country Investment Plan" enabling the country to secure around US$52 million under the "Global Agriculture and Food Security Program" (GAFSP), making it Asia's first recipient. More work and better implementation from the government is necessary for activities to reach fruitful outcomes. Already, 11 ministries and governmental agencies are involved in this integrated endeavor. In the aftermath of the "East Pakistan Coastal Embankment plan" (CEP) in the mid-20th century, Bangladesh has recently started work on the "Master Plan for the South". The southern coastal area is vulnerable to the ill-effects of global climate. Crops, livestock, and fisheries of the southern delta are threatened. There are plans for a US$3 billion multi-purpose bridge named "Pad ma" to transform the agricultural sector in the region. The government estimates a GDP increase of around two percent as a result of the project.

In an effort to achieve middle income country status by 2021, the government is focusing on increasing agriculture production, productivity, water management techniques, surface water infrastructure, irrigation, fisheries, and promoting poultry and dairy development. Bio fuels fit into this scenario by providing energy for agriculture.  In 2006, the Ministry of Agriculture provided a 30 percent subsidy to diesel to power irrigation for farming, further proposing a 7,750 million BDT disbursement to help almost a million farmers with fuel.

Impacts on migration 

Climate change has caused many citizens of Bangladesh to migrate and by 2013 already 6.5 million people had been displaced. Poor and other vulnerable population groups have been affected disproportionally. Dhaka as well as local urban centers are mostly the destination of migration caused by climate change. This leads to an increased pressure on urban infrastructure and services, especially around health and education and creates a heightened risk of conflicts. 

An increased number of floods, due to reduced river gradients, higher rainfall in the Ganges-Meghna-Brahmaputra river basins, and the melting of glaciers in the Himalayas, is considered the major reason for migration in the context of climate change in Bangladesh over all. These floods not only lead to the erosion of arable land, but also impact negatively the other income opportunities and often disrupt the livelihood patterns of whole families. In the northern regions of Bangladesh drought plays a major role in displacement of persons, in the South rising sea levels and cyclones are reasons for migration.

Mitigation and adaptation

Adaptation 

Climate change adaptation and disaster risk reduction may seem two different fields but however both are similar in their objectives which is to build resilience in the face of hazards. The relation between the two field in one study is explained as ‘Climate change adaptation requires the re-shaping and re-designing of development, social and economic practices to respond effectively to new or anticipated environmental changes. Likewise Disaster Risk Reduction seeks to influence development decision-making and protect development aspirations from environment related risks. The effectiveness of both adaptation and DRR are limited if they are not viewed within the broader context of sustainable development.

Bangladesh has shown important results on disaster risk mitigation and is in fact, one of the world leaders in disaster management. It has been made possible as the country changed its disaster programs from prevention to risk reduction. The deaths and damages by natural catastrophes has been drastically reduced in comparison to 1970. Once highly dependent on international aid for providing relief to the affected communities through ad-hoc relief supports, the country soon realized the importance of establishing a culture of resilience to mitigate the risk occurred from the catastrophes.

With a mission ‘to achieve a paradigm shift in disaster management from conventional response and relief  to a more comprehensive risk reduction culture, and to promote food security as an important factor in ensuring the resilience of communities to hazards’ the government of Bangladesh in collaboration with multilateral partners and civil society organizations working on a direction to achieve 3 goals which are i. Saving lives, ii. Protecting investments iii. Effective recovery and building.

Strong institutional setup 

One of the major successes of Bangladesh on adaptation of climate change is a strong institutional setup. The Ministry of Disaster Management and Relief (MoDMR) has a wide range of programs on DRR. It has recently drafted a ‘National Plan for Disaster Management (2016-2020)’ with a detail institutional framework on disaster management. According to the NPDM, disaster management policy and activities is guided by several drivers including, a) Disaster Management Act 2012; b) Standing Orders on Disasters (SOD) first introduced in 1997 and then revised in 2010; (SOD) first introduced in 1997 and then revised in 2010; c) National Plan for  Disaster Management 2010–2015; d) Disaster Policy Act 2015; e) SAARC Framework for Action (SFA) 2006–2015; f) Sendai Framework for Disaster Risk Reduction (SFDRR) 2016–2030; g) Asian Regional Plan for Disaster Risk Reduction (ARPDRR); and the Sustainable Development Goals (SDGs).

Policies and legislation 
Besides the consequences from the impacts of Climate Change, the whole country is yet affected by the results of maladaptation processes. Most of the aid and efforts put in alleviating the systems from vulnerability factors, have being object of bad management resulting in accentuating ethnic hierarchies in some communities, trapping the poor, powerless and displaced in a patronage system, leading to increased human insecurity and intensified violent conflict.

Bangladesh loses land to rising sea levels, but gains land from sediment deposits. The effects of sea level rise and land accretion in Bangladesh are highly regional and variegated. Natural land accretion, paired with targeted policies to secure such land for farming use has the potential to partially mitigate the effects of land lost.

As a Least developed country (LDC), Bangladesh is exempt from any responsibility to reduce greenhouse gas (GHG) emissions, which are the primary cause of global warming. But lately this has been the rallying factor for policy makers to give off higher amounts of emissions in nearly all sectors with disregard for the environment. Large developed industrial nations are emitting increasing quantities of GHGs. The country cannot go far in their struggle with reducing emissions and fighting global warming with the considerable scantily supported funding and help it receives from the international community. There exist plans such as the "National Action Plan on Adaptation" (NAPA) of 2005, and the "Bangladesh Climate Change Strategy and Action Plan" (BCCSAP) of 2009.

BCCSAP states that an integrated approach is necessary and the only way to gain sustainability is where economic and social development is pursued to the exclusion of disaster management, as one major calamity will destroy any socio-economic gains. Around 40–45 percent of GHG emissions are required to be reduced by 2020 and 90–95 percent by 2050. This is using the 1990 GHG concentration levels as a benchmark. With higher population and rapid industrialization, Bangladesh should be on its way to developing a low-carbon path given it initially receives significant financial and technical support from the international community and national goals of economic growth and social development is not hampered. But a more holistic short-term plan is also necessary. Bangladesh has established the Bangladesh Climate Change Trust Fund (BCCTF) and the Bangladesh Climate Change Resilience Fund (BCCRF) allocating US$200 million and cumulating around further US$114 million respectively. Although 3000 cyclone shelters were constructed with over 40,000 trained volunteers and 10,000 km of embankments erected, Bangladesh should not only place emphasis on capacity building and disaster management but also institutional and infrastructure strengthening, development of research and low carbon technologies in order to create an inclusive and truly comprehensive mitigation scheme. Even though it is agreed that the willingness and cooperation of the current UNFCCC parties (194 member states as of 2011) is necessary to help the nation, funds like the Special Climate and LDC, Adaptation Fund should be easily made available.

International cooperation 
Various countries have pledged to provide funding for adaptation and mitigation in developing nations, such as Bangladesh. The accord committed up to US$30 billion of immediate short term funding over the 2010–2012 period from developed to developing countries to support their action in  climate change mitigation. This funding is available for developing nations to build their capacity to reduce emissions and responds to impacts of climate change. Furthermore, this funding will be balanced between mitigation and infrastructure adaptation in various sectors including forestry, science, technology and capacity building. Moreover, the Copenhagen Accord (COP 15) also pledges US$100 million of public and private finance by 2020, mostly to developing nations.

Another misconception is that this accord will divert funding from poverty reduction. The private sector alone contributes more than 85 percent of current investments for a low carbon economy. In order to maximize any future contributions from this sector, the public sector needs to overcome the political and bureaucratic barriers the private sector has to face towards a low carbon future.

The Bangladesh National Adaptation Programme Action - NAPA in its action plan have collected, structured and ranked a series of climate adaptation needs and vulnerabilities, as well as sector-specific costs and benefits. These proposed actions have considered poverty reduction and security of livelihoods with a gender perspective as the most important set of criteria for prioritization of adaptation needs and activities.

Since 2010, donors have invested more than US$170 million with the aim of adapting infrastructure, improving the governance and improving the resilience of the ecosystems. However, when running a detailed analysis, the poverty, inequity and environmental injustices are even higher.

Bangladesh is also supported by different international organizations such as United Nations, World Bank, and so on. With help from the United Nations Development Program (UNDP), Bangladesh developed a flood action plan initiating a culture of disaster management and risk reduction. UNDP also supported Bangladesh to establish the Disaster Management Bureau.

Society and culture

Women 

Bangladesh is prone to flooding and waterlogging because of its location as a river delta. In 2012, it was labeled a Least Developed Country by the United Nations, with high rates of poverty and weak government, meaning it is especially vulnerable to natural disasters. It is densely populated and about 63 percent of its population was working in the agriculture, forestry, or fishing sectors in 2010. Slightly less than half of Bangladesh's population is women and, in 2001, 80 percent of women lived in rural areas. Bangladeshi women are particularly vulnerable to climate change because they have limited mobility and power in society. Research shows that, after the cyclone and flooding of 1991, Bangladeshi women aged 20–44 had a much higher death rate than men of the same age: 71 per 1000, compared to 15 per 1000 for men. Even if a cyclone warning is issued, many women die because they must wait at home for their relatives to return before they can seek shelter.

As climate change progresses, access to and salinization of water sources are becoming problems in Bangladesh. When there is a lack of drinking water, women are responsible for procuring it regardless of the distance they must travel or the terrain they must cover. During natural disasters, male unemployment rises. When men become unemployed, women's responsibilities increase because they must secure and manage income and resources on top of feeding the family and caring for children and the elderly. As the number of men at home without income or occupation rises, more women report mental and physical abuse by their male relatives. To cope with climatic change, women store matches, food for the family, fodder for the livestock, medicine, and fuel sources in safe places in case of disaster. They also teach their children skills such as swimming to prepare them for crisis. The global relief agency CARE believes that climate-resilient jobs such as duck rearing can help increase Bangladeshi women's resilience to climate change.

Since the disasters of 1991, Bangladeshi women are more involved in disaster response decision-making, through local committees and community organizations established by the government and NGOs. As part of the United Nations Framework Convention on Climate Change's National Adaptation Programme of Action (NAPA), Bangladesh published a Poverty Reduction Strategy paper in 2005 that incorporated gender mainstreaming into its climate change adaptation plan, but as of 2008 those goals and policies were not fully implemented.

Media 
In 2018, the New York WILD film festival gave the "Best Short Film" award to a 12-minute documentary, titled Adaptation Bangladesh: Sea Level Rise. The film explores the way in which Bangladeshi farmers are preventing their farms from flooding by building floating gardens made of water hyacinth and bamboo.

Civil society 
Bangladesh also has a large network of NGOs all through the country who are highly active in supporting the people vulnerable from climate change.

Various CSOs and NGOs have been helping the Bangladeshi government in policy formulations. Bangladesh Centre for Advanced Studies (BCAS), SUSHILON, Forum of Environmental Journalists of Bangladesh (FEJB) are some of the CSOs and NGOs that have been actively coordinating the government of Bangladesh in recent years in formulating climate change policies.

See also 
 Environment of Bangladesh
 Energy policy of Bangladesh
 Renewable energy in Bangladesh

References

External links
 Bangladesh Climate Change Trust
 Climate Change in Bangladesh at World Bank
 Energy, Environment and Climate Change of Bangladesh at United Nations Development Program
 Reports on Climate Change in Bangladesh Climate Change Cell, Department of Environment
 Environment and climate change report of Bangladesh
 Integrating Agriculture in National Adaptation Plans
 National Adaptation Plan Global Support Program
 Formulation and Advancement of the National Adaptation Plan Process in Bangladesh
 Bangladesh to empower women and girls in the face of increasing climate impacts
 National Adaptation Plans in focus: Lessons from Bangladesh
 Integrating Climate Change Adaptation into Sustainable Development Pathways of Bangladesh
 Datasets on Climate Change Adaptation
 The Economics of Climate Change Adaptation Programme in Asia and the Pacific
 Economics of Adaptation: Toolkit
 Bangladesh National Adaptation Programme of Action (NAPA)
 Bangladesh's Second National Communication - In Progress
 Community based Adaptation to Climate Change through Coastal Afforestation in Bangladesh
 Community-Based Adaptation: Bangladesh
 Enhancing Adaptive Capacities of Coastal Communities, especially Women, to Cope with Climate Change-Induced Salinity in Bangladesh
 CBA Bangladesh: Community-Based Wetland Management Project (BIRAM)
 CBA Bangladesh: Coping with Climate Risks by Empowering Women in Coastal Areas (GBSS)
 CBA Bangladesh: Piloting Climate-Resilient Development Initiatives (CNRS)
 CBA Bangladesh: Promoting Diversified Agro-Based Activities in Jamalpur District (RDOP)

 
Climate of Bangladesh
Environment of Bangladesh
Bangladesh
Climate change adaptation
Bangladesh